Expressway S17 or express road S17 (pl. Droga ekspresowa S17) is a major road in Poland which, when completed, will run from Warsaw through Lublin to the border crossing with Ukraine at Hrebenne/Rava-Ruska. Its route runs parallel to national road 17 which it is going to replace. As of September 2022,  out of planned  have been completed: the main section running from Warsaw through Lublin to Piaski, as well as bypasses of Tomaszów Lubelski  and Hrebenne.

The joint section of S12 and S17, including the bypass of Lublin, was constructed in years 2011 – 2014. The section between Warsaw and Lublin was to be finished by 2015, but with subsequent reductions in government spending on infrastructure, the investement was delayed. The section was constructed in the design-build system starting late 2015 and early 2016, and the road was opened to traffic in 2019 and 2020.

The road southeast of Lublin has smaller traffic density and received a lower priority, except for the bypass of Tomaszów Lubelski which was opened in 2021 (first carriageway only). Opening of the expressway between Piaski and Ukraine's border is expected from 2026 until 2028 depending on the section.

Sections of the expressway

Lublin bypass
In December 2009, the bidding process was started for the contracts to build the  section of the road around Lublin, from Kurów to Piaski, which includes the city's east-west bypass road. The construction of this section started in 2010, with the first 13 km section to be opened to traffic in late 2012   and the rest in 2014. On this section, S17 overlaps with S12.

S17 in Warsaw

In Warsaw, the S17 expressway will serve as the eastern bypass of the city.  Apart from the southernmost section from Lubelska to Zakręt, which is currently under construction as part of the upgrade of the current National Road DK17 and is scheduled to open in 2022, the construction timetable is not yet set and will depend on government budget decisions.

References

Expressways in Poland
Proposed roads in Poland